France competed at the 1912 Summer Olympics in Stockholm, Sweden. 119 competitors, 118 men and 1 woman, took part in 66 events in 13 sports.

Medalists

Gold
 Jacques Cariou — Equestrian, Individual jumping
 Gaston Thubé, Jacques Thubé and Amédée Thubé — Sailing, Men's 6m class
 Paul Colas — Shooting, Men's 300m free rifle, three positions
 Paul Colas — Shooting, Men's 600m free rifle
 André Gobert and Maurice Germot — Tennis, Men's doubles indoor
 André Gobert — Tennis, Men's singles indoor
 Marguerite Broquedis — Tennis, Women's singles outdoor

Silver
 Charles Poulenard, Pierre Failliot, Charles Lelong and Robert Schurrer — Athletics, Men's 4 × 400 m Relay
 Jean Bouin — Athletics, Men's 5000m
 Louis Ségura — Gymnastics, Men's all-around
 Pierre Dufour d'Astafort, Jacques Cariou, Ernest Meyer and Gaston Seigner — Equestrian, Team jumping

Bronze
 Jacques Cariou — Equestrian, Individual eventing
 Albert Canet and Eduard Meny De Marangue — Tennis, Men's doubles outdoor
 Marguerite Broquedis and Albert Canet — Tennis, Mixed doubles outdoor

Aquatics

Swimming

Three swimmers competed for France at the 1912 Games. It was the third time the nation had competed in swimming. None of the three French swimmers advanced past the quarterfinals in any event.

Ranks given for each swimmer are within the heat.

 Men

Water polo

France made its second appearance in Olympic water polo in 1912; it was the nation's first showing since 1900. The 1912 French team had little success, losing to Sweden and then Belgium to be eliminated from the tournament.

 Quarterfinals

 Repechage final

Athletics

32 athletes represented France. It was the fourth appearance of the nation in athletics, which France appeared in each time the nation appeared at the Olympics. Jean Bouin set a new Olympic record in the 5000 metres in the semifinals, holding it only until the final. Despite dropping another nearly 30 seconds off his time in the final, he came in second a mere .1 seconds behind Hannes Kolehmainen of Finland. The French 4x400 metre relay also took a silver medal to bring the nation's total in athletics to 2 silver medals.

Ranks given are within that athlete's heat for running events.

Cycling

Twelve cyclists represented France. It was the fourth appearance of the nation in cycling, which had only not competed in cycling in 1904. Joseph Racine had the best time in the time trial, the only race held, placing 40th. The French team included the four slowest finishers as well as 3 of the 29 cyclists not to finish. The top four French cyclists had a combined time that placed them 10th of the 15 teams.

Road cycling

Equestrian

 Dressage

 Eventing
(The maximum score in each of the five events was 10.00 points. Ranks given are for the cumulative score after each event. Team score is the sum of the top three individual scores.)

 Jumping
(Team score is the sum of the top three individual scores.)

Gymnastics

Six gymnasts represented France. It was the fourth appearance of the nation in gymnastics, in which France had not competed only in 1904. Louis Ségura, the defending bronze medalist, earned the silver in the individual all-around. France did not enter a team in any of the team competitions.

Artistic

Modern pentathlon 

France had two competitors in the first Olympic pentathlon competition. The French pentathletes placed 15th and 19th among the 22 finishers.

(The scoring system was point-for-place in each of the five events, with the smallest point total winning.)

Rowing 

Seventeen rowers represented France. It was the nation's second appearance in rowing, and first since the nation hosted the 1900 Summer Olympics. No French boat reached the semifinals.

(Ranks given are within each crew's heat.)

Sailing 

Three sailors, a set of brothers, represented France. It was the nation's third appearance in sailing, in which France had competed each time the sport was held at the Olympics. France's single boat took the gold medal in the six metre class, winning a two-boat race-off after tying in the standings after the first two races.

(7 points for 1st in each race, 3 points for 2nd, 1 point for 3rd. Race-off to break ties in total points if necessary for medal standings.)

Shooting 

Nineteen shooters represented France. It was the nation's fourth appearance in shooting, in which France had not competed only in 1904. Paul Colas won a pair of gold medals, the only medals France won in 1912 and the first golds the nation had won since 1900.

Tennis 

Six tennis players, including one woman, represented France at the 1912 Games. It was the nation's fourth appearance in tennis, having missed only 1904. The lone French woman, Broquedis, won the women's outdoor singles event while Gobert took the men's indoor singles championship. The indoor men's doubles pair also won, giving Gobert two gold medals. Broquedis had a second medal, taking the bronze along with Canet in the outdoor mixed pairs. Canet finished with a pair of bronzes, his other one coming in partnership with Mény in the men's outdoor doubles.

 Men

 Women

 Mixed

Wrestling

Greco-Roman

France was represented by six wrestlers in its Olympic wrestling debut. None of the six was able to win a single match, each being eliminated after losing their first two bouts.

Art Competitions

References

External links
Official Olympic Reports
International Olympic Committee results database

Nations at the 1912 Summer Olympics
1912
Olympics